Isak Stianson Pedersen (born 4 June 1997) is an Icelandic cross-country skier. He competed in the 2018 Winter Olympics.

References

1997 births
Living people
Cross-country skiers at the 2018 Winter Olympics
Cross-country skiers at the 2022 Winter Olympics
Icelandic male cross-country skiers
Olympic cross-country skiers of Iceland
21st-century Icelandic people